Radiance is a double-album by American pianist Keith Jarrett recorded in 2002 in Japan at two different concerts: Osaka (October 27) and Tokyo (October 30). It was released by ECM Records in 2005.
And in April 2006, a video recording of the live performance at Tokyo concert was released as Tokyo Solo.

After dismissing the idea of performing lengthy improvised solos (see A Multitude of Angels), Radiance marked a new beginning in Jarrett's approach to solo piano concerts and this would be assessed in future solo recordings. According to keithjarrett.org, the documented 2002 Osaka and Tokyo concerts were only his third and fourth solo performances since temporarily retiring due to chronic fatigue syndrome; the other two had taken place in Tokyo in September 1999.

Original notes 
On the double-CD original notes, "Some Words About The Music", Keith Jarrett states that:

Reception 

The AllMusic review by Thom Jurek awarded the album 4.5 stars, stating, "His process is immediate, poignant, and utterly engaging throughout and marks a new phase in his solo recordings that will spur great interest in any open-minded listener interested in improvisational music.".

The authors of The Penguin Guide to Jazz awarded the album 4 stars, and wrote: "this superb Osaka set is one of the highlights of his career. Having looked again at free playing alongside his standards repertoire, Jarrett had the confidence to sit down at the piano... and simply let the music flow through him... these two discs create a strong impression of two performances that develop out of tiny germs of ideas... It's what Jarrett does with them that is remarkable... A riveting and arresting record."

Track listing 
All music by Keith Jarrett
Disc one (Osaka: October 27)
 "Radiance, Part 1"12:18  
 "Radiance, Part 2"8:53  
 "Radiance, Part 3"5:58  
 "Radiance, Part 4"1:33  
 "Radiance, Part 5"10:58  
 "Radiance, Part 6"8:00  
 "Radiance, Part 7"9:51  
 "Radiance, Part 8"5:25  
 "Radiance, Part 9"6:11

Disc two
(Osaka: October 27)
 "Radiance, Part 10"13:55
 "Radiance, Part 11"1:40  
 "Radiance, Part 12"7:06  
 "Radiance, Part 13"5:58
(Tokyo: October 30)
 "Radiance, Part 14"14:04  
 "Radiance, Part 15"10:03  
 "Radiance, Part 16"3:23  
 "Radiance, Part 17"14:12

Total effective playing time: 2:14:01 (the album contains 5:35 applause approximately)

Personnel 
 Keith Jarrettpiano

Production
 Manfred Eicher producer
 Martin Pearsonrecording engineer
 Yoshihiro Suzukiassistant engineer
 Sascha Kleisdesign
 Peter Neussercover photograpy
 Junichi Hirayamacover photography

References

External links 
 

Keith Jarrett live albums
2005 live albums
ECM Records live albums
Albums produced by Manfred Eicher
Instrumental albums
Solo piano jazz albums